Moesia Prima (Latin: Moesia) was a frontier province of the late Roman Empire, situated in the central parts of present-day Serbia, along the south bank of the Danube River. Provincial capital was Viminacium, near modern Kostolac in Serbia).

History

Province of Moesia Prima was created at the end of the 3rd century during administrative reforms of Roman emperor Diocletian (284–305) who divided the Province of Moesia Superior in two separate provinces: Moesia Prima to the north and Dardania to the south.

Sometime in 293–294, emperor Diocletian traveled through Moesia Superior and came to its capital Viminacium. During that visit he created new province under the name Moesia Superior Margensis or Moesia Prima. The term Margensis was used in reference to the name of Margus River that runs through the province. Emperor also registered that the inhabitants of province wrote in Latin, as opposed to Greek in the southern regions.

At first, Province of Moesia Prima belonged to the Diocese of Moesia. Probably under emperor Constantine I (306–337), the Diocese of Moesia was split in two, forming the Diocese of Dacia in the north and Diocese of Macedonia in the south. Province of Moesia Prima became part of Diocese of Dacia, that belonged to the Praetorian prefecture of Illyricum.

The emperor Jovian (363-364) who reestablished Christianity as the official religion of the Roman Empire was born in Moesia Prima, in Singidunum. In his early career, later Roman emperor Theodosius I served as military commander of Moesia Prima in 373. In 382 Roman emperors Theodosius I and Gratian met in Viminacium, the capital of Moesia Prima, during the Gothic Wars.

Danubian border of Moesia Prima was protected by fortifications of the limes. Two Roman legions were stationed in the province: Legio IV Flavia Felix in Singidunum and Legio VII Claudia in Viminacium. The seat of Praefectus legionis septimae Claudiae was in the frontier fortress of Cuppae (Golubac, Serbia).

As a frontier province, Moesia Prima was under constant threat of barbaric invasions. In the middle of the 5th century the province was devastated by the Huns of Attila who took Singidunum and Viminacium in 441. The province was later invaded by various Germanic tribes like Ostrogoths, Gepids, Heruli and others.

Major efforts to secure the province were undertaken in the time of Justinian I (527–565) who rebuilt Viminacium and Singidunum around 535, restoring the frontier fortresses to their former military importance. 

In 535, emperor Justinian I (527-565) created the Archbishopric of Justiniana Prima as a regional primacy with ecclesiastical jurisdiction over all provinces of the Diocese of Dacia, including the province of Moesia Prima'.

Throughout the 6th century, Moesia Prima was often invaded by Slavs. The province was also invaded but the Avars who took Singidunum and Viminacium during the war of 582-584. During emperor Maurice's military campaigns against Avars and Slavs, Moesia Prima served as a base of military operations.

After the fall of emperor Maurice in 602, Byzantine defenses in Moesia Prima finally collapsed. At the very beginning of the 7th century, Avars and Slavs sacked and burned Singidunum and Viminacium to the ground and the interior of the fallen province Moesia Prima was finally settled by the Slavic Serbs.

Cities and towns

The chief towns of Moesia Prima were: Viminacium (sometimes called municipium Aelium; modern Kostolac) and Singidunum (Belgrade).

See also
Province of Moesia
Province of Moesia Superior
Inscriptions of Upper Moesia
Battles of Viminacium
Diocese of Moesia
Diocese of Dacia
Margus (city)

References

Sources

 Procopius. Edited by H. B. Dewing. 7 vols. Loeb Classical Library. Cambridge, Mass.: Harvard University Press and London, Hutchinson, 1914–40. Greek text and English translation.
 Maurice's Strategikon: Handbook of Byzantine Military Strategy. translated by George T. Dennis. Philadelphia 1984, Reprint 2001.
 Fischer Weltgeschichte, Band 13, "Byzanz''" (pp. 139ff.). Franz Georg Maier, Frankfurt a. M. (1973)

External links
  Inscriptions of Moesia Superior, University of Belgrade
 CITIES IN THE PROVINCES MOESIA SUPERIOR AND MOESIA INFERIOR 

Moesia
Late Roman provinces
Serbia in the Roman era
Historical regions in Serbia
Ancient history of the Balkans
States and territories established in the 290s